Nezara is a genus of plant-feeding stink bug of the family Pentatomidae, first described by Charles Jean-Baptiste Amyot & Jean Guillaume Audinet-Serville in 1843.

Species
(From Biolib)
 Nezara antennata Scott, 1874 
 Nezara capicola (Westwood, 1837) 
 Nezara griseipennis Ellenrieder, 1862 
 Nezara icterica Horváth, 1889 
 Nezara immaculata Freeman, 1940 
 Nezara indica Azim & Shafee, 1979 
 †Nezara latitesta Theobald, 1937 
 Nezara mendax Breddin, 1908 
 Nezara naspirus (Dallas, 1851) 
 Nezara niamensis (Distant, 1890) 
 Nezara nigromaculata Distant, 1902 
 Nezara orbiculata Distant, 1890 
 Nezara paradoxus Cachan, 1952 
 Nezara pulchricornis Breddin, 1903 
 Nezara raropunctata Ellenrieder, 1862 
 Nezara robusta Distant, 1898 
 Nezara similis Freeman, 1940 
 Nezara soror Schouteden, 1905 
 Nezara subrotunda Breddin, 1908 
 Nezara viridula (Linnaeus, 1758) – southern green shieldbug 
 Nezara yunnana Zheng, 1982

References 

Pentatomidae genera
Pentatomomorpha genera
Nezarini
Taxa described in 1843
Taxa named by Charles Jean-Baptiste Amyot
Taxa named by Jean Guillaume Audinet-Serville